Little Moose Lake is a lake east-southeast of Old Forge in Herkimer County, New York. It drains south via Little Moose Outlet which flows into the South Branch Moose River. Panther Lake is located south of Little Moose Lake.

See also
 List of lakes in New York

References 

Lakes of New York (state)
Lakes of Herkimer County, New York